The Sunday Times Rich List 2014 was the 26th annual survey of the wealthiest people resident in the United Kingdom, published by The Sunday Times on 18 May 2014.

The Guardian reported that "the combined fortune of Britain's richest 1,000 people has hit a new high of £519bn – equivalent to a third of the nation's economic output, and double the figure of five years ago."

Top 12 fortunes

See also 
 Forbes list of billionaires

References

External links 
 Sunday Times Rich List

Sunday Times Rich List
2014 in the United Kingdom